Lilje is a surname. Notable people with the surname include:

 Hanns Lilje (1899–1977), German Lutheran bishop
 Per Barth Lilje (born 1957), Norwegian astronomer